A nilometer was a structure for measuring the Nile River's clarity and water level during the annual flood season. There were three main types of nilometers, calibrated in Egyptian cubits: (1) a vertical column, (2) a corridor stairway of steps leading down to the Nile, or (3) a deep well with culvert. If the water level was low, the fertility of the floodplain would suffer. If it was too high, the flooding would be destructive. There was a specific mark that indicated how high the flood should be if the fields were to get good soil.

Nilometers originated in Pharaonic times, were also built in Roman times, and were used until the Aswan Dam rendered them obsolete in the 1960s.

Description

Between July and November, the reaches of the Nile running through Egypt would burst their banks and cover the adjacent floodplain. When the waters receded, around September or October, they left behind a rich alluvial deposit of exceptionally fertile black silt over the croplands. The akhet, or Season of the Inundation, was one of the three seasons into which the ancient Egyptians divided their year.

Importance

The annual flood was of great importance to Egyptian civilization. A moderate inundation was a vital part of the agricultural cycle; however, a lighter inundation than normal would cause famine, and too much flood water would be equally disastrous, washing away much of the infrastructure built on the flood plain. Records from AD 622999 indicate that, on average, 28% of the years saw an inundation that fell short of expectations.

The ability to predict the volume of the coming inundation was part of the mystique of the Ancient Egyptian priesthood. The same skill also played a political and administrative role, since the quality of the year's flood was used to determine the levels of tax to be paid. This is where the nilometer came into play, with priests monitoring the day-to-day level of the river and announcing the awaited arrival of the summer flood.

Designs
  
The simplest nilometer design is a vertical column submerged in the waters of the river, with marked intervals indicating the depth of the water.
One that follows this simple design, albeit housed in an elaborate and ornate stone structure, can still be seen on the island of Rhoda in central Cairo   This nilometer visible today dates as far back as AD 861, when the Abbasid caliph al-Mutawakkil ordered its construction, overseen by the astronomer Alfraganus. It was built on a site occupied by an earlier specimen which was seen by the Syrian Orthodox patriarch Dionysius of Tel Mahre in 830. This prior nilometer had been ordered in AD 715 by Usāma b. Zayd b. ʿAdī, who was in charge of collecting the land tax (kharaj) in Egypt for the Umayyad caliph Sulaymān ibn ʿAbd al-Malik.

The second nilometer design comprises a flight of stairs leading down into the water, with depth markings along the walls.
The best known example of this kind can be seen on the island of Elephantine in Aswan, where a stairway of 52 steps leads down to a doorway at the Nile. This location was also particularly important, since for much of Egyptian history, Elephantine marked Egypt's southern border and was therefore the first place where the onset of the annual flood was detected.

The most elaborate design involved a channel or culvert that led from the riverbank – often running for a considerable distance – and then fed a well, tank, or cistern. These nilometer wells were most frequently located within the confines of temples, where only the priests and rulers were allowed access.
A particularly fine example, with a deep, cylindrical well and a culvert opening in the surrounding wall, can be seen at the Temple of Kom Ombo, to the north of Aswan.

Usage
While nilometers originated in Pharaonic times, they continued to be used by the later civilizations that held sway in Egypt. Some were constructed in Roman times.

In the 20th century, the Nile's annual inundation was first greatly reduced, and then eliminated entirely, with the construction of the Aswan dams. While the Aswan High Dam's impact on Egypt and its agriculture has been controversial for other, more complex reasons, it has also had the additional effect of rendering the nilometer obsolete.

See also 

 
Hunger stone

Notes

References 
 

Architecture in Egypt
Measuring instruments
Nile
Water supply
Hydrology instrumentation